The Mask was a theatrical magazine published by Edward Gordon Craig from 1908 to 1921. Initially it was published monthly, but soon became quarterly. There were eighty seven issues in total.

References

Defunct magazines published in the United Kingdom
Magazines established in 1908
Magazines disestablished in 1921
Monthly magazines published in the United Kingdom
Quarterly magazines published in the United Kingdom
Visual arts magazines published in the United Kingdom
Theatre magazines